Star is a city in northwestern Ada County, Idaho, with parts stretching into neighboring Canyon County. The population was 5,793 at the 2010 census, up from 1,795 in 2000. It was named in the 19th century by travelers on their way to Middleton and Boise who used the star on the school house to find east and west. The name stuck and it became Star, Idaho. Today, it is a rapidly growing suburb of Boise and its schools are shared with Middleton School District and West Ada School District.

Star is part of the Boise metropolitan area.

Geography

Demographics

2020 census 
At the 2020 census there were 11,117 people in 3,407 households in the city. The racial makeup of the city was 95.2% White, 0.3% African American, 0.7% Native American, 1.1% Asian, 0.0% Pacific Islander, 2.4% from two or more races. Hispanic or Latino of any race were 8.2%.  

Of the 3,407 households , there was an average of 2.67 people per household. 80.1% of residences were owner occupied. 

2010

At the 2010 census there were 5,793 people in 1,927 households, including 1,551 families, in the city. The racial makeup of the city was 93.5% White, 0.6% African American, 0.8% Native American, 0.6% Asian, 0.1% Pacific Islander, 2.1% from other races, and 2.4% from two or more races. Hispanic or Latino of any race were 6.7%.

Of the 1,927 households 49.9% had children under the age of 18 living with them, 65.7% were married couples living together, 10.5% had a female householder with no husband present, 4.3% had a male householder with no wife present, and 19.5% were non-families. 15.4% of households were one person and 4.9% were one person aged 65 or older. The average household size was 3.00 and the average family size was 3.33.

The median age was 32.3 years. 34.7% of residents were under the age of 18; 5.1% were between the ages of 18 and 24; 30.7% were from 25 to 44; 21.4% were from 45 to 64; and 7.9% were 65 or older. The gender makeup of the city was 49.2% male and 50.8% female.

2000 census
At the 2000 census there were 1,795 people in 631 households, including 485 families, in the city. The racial makeup of the city was 92.87% White, 0.28% African American, 0.95% Native American, 0.22% Asian, 0.06% Pacific Islander, 0.89% from other races, and 4.74% from two or more races. Hispanic or Latino of any race were 4.29%.

Of the 631 households 48.0% had children under the age of 18 living with them, 60.2% were married couples living together, 11.7% had a female householder with no husband present, and 23.1% were non-families. 16.8% of households were one person and 4.1% were one person aged 65 or older. The average household size was 2.82 and the average family size was 3.19.

The age distribution was 33.2% under the age of 18, 9.9% from 18 to 24, 36.4% from 25 to 44, 14.8% from 45 to 64, and 5.7% 65 or older. The median age was 28 years. For every 100 females, there were 97.0 males. For every 100 females age 18 and over, there were 92.8 males.

The median household income was $42,337 and the median family income was $46,458. Males had a median income of $31,028 versus $22,625 for females. The per capita income for the city was $15,864. About 5.4% of families and 8.5% of the population were below the poverty line, including 10.7% of those under age 18 and 13.6% of those age 65 or over.

Notable people 

 James A. Brown, football and basketball coach
 Davey Hamilton Jr., racing driver
 Mike Moyle, member and majority leader of the Idaho House of Representatives
 Lori Otter, wife of Butch Otter and former First Lady of Idaho

References

External links
  - City of Star
 Chamber of Commerce - Star, Idaho
 Star Fire District

Cities in Ada County, Idaho
Cities in Idaho
Boise metropolitan area